Escatawpa River is a  river in the states of Alabama and Mississippi. It is a tributary of the Pascagoula River.

Escatawpa  is a name derived from the Choctaw language meaning "where cane is cut".

See also
List of rivers of Alabama
List of rivers of Mississippi

References

Rivers of Alabama
Rivers of Mississippi
Alabama placenames of Native American origin
Mississippi placenames of Native American origin